La Molisana ("The One from Molise") is an Italian food company based in Campobasso. It was founded in 1912.

La Molisana produces a range of pasta. The company exports products to about 50 countries and offers private-label production services.

External links
 

Italian pasta companies
Food and drink companies established in 1912
Italian brands
Italian companies established in 1912
Companies based in Molise